Lenifusus elongatus  is a species of sea snail, a marine gastropod mollusk in the family Melongenidae, the crown conches and their allies.

Description

Distribution
Vietnam.

References

  Kosuge S. (2008). Description of Hemifusus zhangyii Kosuge, n. sp. (Gastropoda, Melongelidae). Bulletin of the Institute of Malacology, Tokyo. 3(9): 131-132, pl. 43.
 Dekkers A. (2018). Two new genera in the family Melongenidae from the Indo-Pacific and comments on the identity of Hemifusus zhangyii Kosuge, 2008 and Pyrula elongata Lamarck, 1822 (Gastropoda, Neogastropoda: Buccinoidea). Gloria Maris. 57(2): 40-50

External links
 Gmelin J.F. (1791). Vermes. In: Gmelin J.F. (Ed.) Caroli a Linnaei Systema Naturae per Regna Tria Naturae, Ed. 13. Tome 1(6). G.E. Beer, Lipsiae [Leipzig. pp. 3021-3910]
  Lamarck, [J.-B. M. de. (1822). Histoire naturelle des animaux sans vertèbres. Tome septième. Paris: published by the Author, 711 pp.]

Melongenidae
Gastropods described in 2008